Laurent Baheux (born 1970) is a French photographer known for high contrast black and white photographs of nature and wildlife.

Baheux's work about Africa and wildlife is featured in art photography galleries worldwide and in awareness campaigns for conservation and environmental organizations including World Wildlife Fund (WWF), GoodPlanet Foundation, and United Nations Environment Programme (UNEP).  He is a UNEP Goodwill Ambassador for the anti-poaching initiative with images being featured in the "Wild and Precious" International Airport Exhibition.

Style 

Drawing inspiration from photographers such as Ansel Adams, Peter Beard, Henri Cartier-Bresson, Sebastiao Salgado and Richard Avedon, Baheux's images are high contrast with very deep blacks. His work is often associated with that of portraitists such as the French photography Studio Harcourt.

Baheux works with NIKON products and uses very large lenses to capture the animal's personalities without disturbing their environment.

Award & Honors 
 2007 Shell Wildlife Photographer of the Year in the "Creative Vision of Nature" category for his image Lions tail taken in Kenya (Africa) in 2006.
 2008 WWF Biodiversity price of the International Festival of the Environment Image of Paris (France).
 2014 Honorable mention in Portfolio category -  Black and White Magazine.
 2014 Honorable mention in Portfolio category -  Adore Noir Magazine.
 2014 Honorable mention in Animal World category - World Mountains, Nature and Adventure Photography Competition Memorial Maria Luisa.
 2014 Honorable mention in Wildlife/Animal category - Fine Art Photography Awards.
 2016 Nominated at German Phonebook Award  with The Family Album of Wild Africa (teNeues & YellowKorner conditions)
 2016 Honorable mention in Wildlife category - Moscow International Foto Awards.

Books 
2008 Photographes de nature, Actes Sud
2009 Terre des lions, Altus 
2010 Africa (Portfolio n°1), YellowKorner
2011 D’ivoire et d’ébène, Altus 
2012 Africa (art book edition), YellowKorner
2013 Africa (Classic edition), YellowKorner
2013 Wild and Precious, La Martinière with GoodPlanet  
2015 America (Portfolio n°27), Yellowkorner
2015 The Family Album of Wild Africa, teNeues and Yellowkorner editions
2016 The Family Album of Wild Africa Collector's Prints, teNeues and Yellowkorner editions
2017 Ice is Black, teNeues editions
2017 The Family Album of Wild Africa, Small format edition, teNeues editions
2018 Animalité, avec Audrey Jougla, Atlande editions

References

External links 

1970 births
Living people
French photographers
Nature photographers
Monochrome photography